Article 11 of the European Convention on Human Rights protects the right to freedom of assembly and association, including the right to form trade unions, subject to certain restrictions that are "in accordance with law" and "necessary in a democratic society".

Case law
Communist Party of Germany v. the Federal Republic of Germany (1957)
Plattform "Ärzte für das Leben" v. Austria (1988)
Vogt v Germany (1995)
Wilson and Palmer v United Kingdom [2002] ECHR 552
Yazar, Karatas, Aksoy and Hep v Turkey (2003) 36 EHRR 59
Church of Scientology Moscow v Russia (2007)
ASLEF v United Kingdom (2007)
Bączkowski v Poland (2007)
Demir and Baykara v Turkey [2008] ECHR 1345

See also
European Convention on Human Rights
European labour law
UK labour law
German labour law

Notes

External links
ECtHR case-law factsheet on trade unions rights

 
11
Trade union law